Piaskowiec may refer to:

Piaskowiec, Pomeranian Voivodeship, a village in the administrative district of Gmina Ostaszewo, Poland
Piaskowiec, Warmian-Masurian Voivodeship, a village in the administrative district of Gmina Korsze, Poland

See also 
Piaskowice